Joseph J. Kelly (July 5, 1897 – July 6, 1963) was an Irish-American attorney and politician serving as mayor of Buffalo, New York. He held the office from 1942 to 1945.

Early life 

Joseph James Kelly was born in Buffalo, New York on July 5, 1897. His father was James W. Kelly, the founder of the American Body Company, and a local Democratic politician.

Kelly served with a training unit in World War I and then entered the University at Buffalo Law School, graduating in 1920. He spent several years as a trial lawyer before being endorsed by the Democratic Party for a 1933 run for City Court. He was approached to run for mayor in 1937 but declined in favor of remaining on the bench.

In 1940 Kelly was again approached with a request to run for mayor, this time accepting. The primary election was held on September 16, 1941 and Kelly defeated former Mayor Frank Schwab. William Fisher secured the Republican nomination.

Life as mayor 

In an election held on November 5, 1941, Kelly defeated Fisher in a close race and was sworn in on December 31.

Kelly's term was largely uneventful until January 2, 1945 when the city experienced what was called the worst storm in its history.

When his term ended in 1945, Kelly opted not to run again, instead returning to private life.

Personal life 

Kelly was not married at any point during his public career, but on March 7, 1949 married Laura Campbell Stephenson; the two never had children.

On July 6, 1963 Joseph Kelly died in Buffalo General Hospital following a brief illness.

References 

 
City of Buffalo, List of Mayors

1897 births
1963 deaths
American people of Irish descent
Mayors of Buffalo, New York
20th-century American politicians
University at Buffalo alumni